Proteodoxa is a genus of moth in the family Gelechiidae. It contains the species Proteodoxa cirrhopa, which is found in the Democratic Republic of Congo (North Kivu, Orientale).

References

Gelechiinae